The Havalinas are an American gypsy-folk-rock band from California, formed in 1989 in Los Angeles by Tim Scott McConnell and Stephen Dennis Smith (Smutty Smiff) - former bandmates in Levi and the Rockats, a punk-styled rockabilly group. After four months of rehab, Smith travelled back from Arizona to find McConnell quitting the music business, making a living as a doorman and housekeeper.

At first, they were playing at Smiff's home in the Fairfax district, then in a nearby Molly Malone's pub. They gained public attention for their unique sound, lyrics and anti-establishment vibes. After recruiting Charlie Quintana into the project, the band started to gain major label attention. They signed to Elektra Records and released self-titled album in 1990.

The band achieved success and toured with the Beat Farmers, Bob Dylan, Chris Isaak, Tina Turner, and Crowded House.

The biggest recognition the band has received was in 2014 when Bruce Springsteen covered the song "High Hopes" on same titled album, which took number one place in 15 countries. Springsteen said that he is the biggest fan of McConnell's talent.

References

American folk musical groups